State of the Union, branded as State of the Union with Jake Tapper and Dana Bash, is an American Sunday talk show and political discussion television program on CNN and broadcast around the world by CNN International. It has been co-anchored by Jake Tapper since 2015 and Dana Bash since 2021.  It has been broadcast since its debut in January 2009.

The program is broadcast from 9:00am to 10:00am ET, with a replay at noon to 1:00pm ET from CNN's studios in Washington D.C.

History
The program premiered on January 18, 2009, originally with John King as host, and aired from 9:00am to 1:00pm ET (though only the 9:00am and noon ET hours are simulcast on CNN International) and from 8:00pm to 9:00pm ET. It features news analysis and interviews with politicians, reporters, and newsmakers, as well as the "Magic Wall", an interactive touch screen map previously used by King to cover the 2008 presidential election. At four hours long, it was by far the longest of the Sunday talk shows. It was created as a merger between Reliable Sources and Late Edition with Wolf Blitzer; Reliable Sources continued unchanged as a one-hour "segment" of State of the Union. On February 11, 2009, CNN announced it had hired former Meet the Press producer Michelle Jaconi as the executive producer of the program.

On a January 31, 2010, broadcast, John King announced that senior political correspondent Candy Crowley would become the new anchor of the program, following King's move to take over Lou Dobbs' former timeslot. In the move, the program was cut from four hours to one, and the Reliable Sources "show within a show" was spun off once again as its own program.

After Crowley left CNN in December 2014, State of the Union had a series of fill-ins until Jake Tapper was named permanent host in April 2015. In January 2021, CNN announced that Dana Bash would join Tapper as a co-host, with the two alternating Sundays hosting.

References

External links

CNN original programming
2000s American television talk shows
2010s American television talk shows
2020s American television talk shows
2009 American television series debuts
American Sunday morning talk shows